Megavolt may refer to:
One million volts in electronics and physics
Megavolt (Darkwing Duck), a fictional supervillain in the Disney animated series Darkwing Duck.
Megavolt, a villain in the television seriesTeenage Mutant Ninja Turtles